Mai Ahmad Fatty is a Gambian politician, who served as the Minister of the Interior under Adama Barrow.

From 1 February to 10 November 2017 he was Minister of the Interior in President Adama Barrow's cabinet. Since 2009 he is the leader of the Gambia Moral Congress (GMC). From 2011 to November 2016, he left Gambia, after being threatened following the 2011 presidential election.

References 

Living people
Gambian politicians
Year of birth missing (living people)
Interior ministers of the Gambia
Leaders of political parties in the Gambia